The Polyclinic No. 1 is a constructivist building designed by P. Shchyokin. It is located on Serebrennikovskaya Street in the Tsentralny City District of Novosibirsk, Russia.

History
The Polyclinic was built in 1928. The cost of construction amounted to 600,000 rubles.

At first the medical staff consisted of 132 medical workers (34 doctors).

In 2002, the polyclinic employed 346 medical workers (112 doctors).

See also
 Gosbank Building
 October Revolution House of Culture
 House of Artists

Bibliography

External links
 The First Polyclinic. The Constructivist Project.
 The Polyclinic No. 1. Novosibdom.ru.
 The Polyclinic. The Novosibirsk Museum.

Tsentralny City District, Novosibirsk
Buildings and structures in Novosibirsk
Constructivist architecture
Buildings and structures completed in 1928
Medical and health organizations based in Russia
Buildings and structures built in the Soviet Union
Hospitals built in the Soviet Union
Hospitals in Novosibirsk
Cultural heritage monuments of regional significance in Novosibirsk Oblast